Pyropelta yamato is a species of small sea snail, a deep-water limpet, a marine gastropod mollusks in the family Pyropeltidae.

Habitat 
This small limpet occurs at hydrothermal vents and seeps

References

Pyropeltidae
Gastropods described in 2003